Édouard Joly, born in Burgundy in 1898, deceased in 1982 was a French aeroplane designer best known for his work with Jean Délémontez on the Jodel range of light aircraft.

Biography 

Joly worked for 14 years at a company that sold and repaired farm equipment. During First World War, he was mobilized as an aviation mechanic and stationed first in Avord and then in Dijon. At the end of the war, he returned to the company of which he in time became the owner.

His interest for aviation pushed him to become in 1932 one of the founding members of the aero club Beaunois. He then built and owned several sailplanes including one Flying Flea. In 1946, he joined his son-in-law Jean Délémontez to found the Jodel company for the study, construction and repair of airplanes. Together they designed the line of Jodel and Robin planes of which more than 6,000 were built in the following 50 years.

References

1898 births
1982 deaths
French aerospace engineers